Jabloňovce is a village and municipality in the Levice District in the Nitra Region of Slovakia.

History
In historical records the village was first mentioned in 1245.

Geography
The village lies at an altitude of 291 metres and covers an area of 34.694 km². It has a population of about 208 people.

Ethnicity
The village is approximately 99% Slovak.

Facilities
The village has a public library and soccer pitch.

Genealogical resources

The records for genealogical research are available at the state archive "Statny Archiv in Nitra, Slovakia"

See also
 List of municipalities and towns in Slovakia

External links
https://web.archive.org/web/20071027094149/http://www.statistics.sk/mosmis/eng/run.html
Surnames of living people in Jablonovce

Villages and municipalities in Levice District